William Darton, Sr. (1755–1819) was a British publisher of children's books.  His business was located on Gracechurch Street in London.

Darton was the son of John Darton, an innkeeper. Darton's son William Darton, Jr. (1781–1854) was with the firm in Holborn. Another descendant, Joseph William Darton (1844–1916), became a founding partner in the British publisher Wells Gardner, Darton and Company.

See also
F. J. Harvey Darton

References

External links
 
 
Works by William Darton at Toronto Public Library
 
 William Darton, Jr. (1781–1854) at LC Authorities, with 10 records, and at WorldCat

Publishers (people) from London
1755 births
1819 deaths